Mark Ernest Weatherington (born 1967) is a United States Air Force lieutenant general who serves as the deputy commander of the Air Force Global Strike Command since August 2021. He most recently served as commander of both the Eighth Air Force and the Joint-Global Strike Operations Center. He previously served as the deputy commander of Air Education and Training Command from April 2018 to May 2020. Weatherington was commissioned after graduating from the United States Air Force Academy in 1990.

In July 2021, he was nominated for promotion to lieutenant general and assignment as deputy commander of the Air Force Global Strike Command, succeeding Anthony J. Cotton.

Effective dates of promotions

References

External links 

1967 births
Living people
United States Air Force Academy alumni
Hardin–Simmons University alumni
United States Air Force generals
Recipients of the Air Force Distinguished Service Medal
Recipients of the Defense Superior Service Medal
Recipients of the Legion of Merit